Martin Glynn may refer to:
 Martin H. Glynn, governor of New York
 Martin Glynn (criminologist), British poet, theatre director, cultural activist and criminologist
 Martin Glynn (priest), rector of the Irish College of Bordeaux
 Martin Glynn (bobsleigh), Canadian bobsledder
 Martin Glynn, namesake of Glynn, Louisiana